Ashley Hutchinson (born 9 May 1979 in Cairns) is an Australian former track cyclist. He won the team pursuit at the 2004 UCI Track Cycling World Championships with Luke Roberts, Peter Dawson and Stephen Wooldridge. He also won a bronze medal in the event in 2005.

Major results

2000
 UCI World Cup, Cali
1st Madison
2nd Team pursuit
2003
 3rd Team pursuit, UCI World Cup, Cape Town
2004
 1st  Team pursuit, UCI World Championships
 Oceania Games
1st  Points race
1st  Scratch
 3rd Team pursuit, UCI World Cup, Manchester
2005
 1st Team pursuit, 2005–06 UCI World Cup, Moscow
 3rd  Team pursuit, UCI World Championships
2006
 Commonwealth Games
2nd  Scratch
2nd  Team pursuit

References

External links 

1979 births
Living people
Australian male cyclists
Commonwealth Games silver medallists for Australia
Cyclists at the 2006 Commonwealth Games
UCI Track Cycling World Champions (men)
Sportspeople from Cairns
Commonwealth Games medallists in cycling
Australian track cyclists
20th-century Australian people
21st-century Australian people
Sportsmen from Queensland
Cyclists from Queensland
Medallists at the 2006 Commonwealth Games